The following is a list of notable Middlebury College alumni, including both graduates and attendees. For a list of Middlebury faculty, refer to the list of Middlebury College faculty.

Notable alumni

Academia

College and university presidents
 Nathan S.S. Beman 1807 – President of Rensselaer Polytechnic Institute, 1845–1865
 Jonathan Blanchard 1832 – abolitionist and president of Knox and Wheaton Colleges
 Ezra Brainerd 1864 – President of Middlebury College, 1885–1908
 Martin Henry Freeman 1849 – first black president of an American college, later serving as president of Liberia College
 Edward Hitchcock 1846 (DD) – geologist; 3rd President of Amherst College (1845–1854)
 Harvey Denison Kitchel 1835 – Congregationalist minister; president of Middlebury College, 1866–1875
 Joel H. Linsley 1811 – Congregational minister and president of Marietta College
 Carolyn "Biddy" Martin (MA) – 19th President of Amherst College; Chancellor of the University of Wisconsin–Madison; Provost of Cornell University
 Charles S. Murkland 1884 – first elected President of the New Hampshire College of Agriculture and the Mechanic Arts following the college's move from Hanover to Durham
 Stephen Olin 1820 – educator and minister; first President of Randolph Macon College (1834–1837); president of Wesleyan University (1839–1851)
 John Martin Thomas 1890 – ninth president of Middlebury College, the ninth president of Penn State, and the twelfth president of Rutgers University

Professors

 Mary Annette Anderson 1899 – first black woman elected to Phi Beta Kappa; later a professor at Howard University
 John Barlow 1895 – entomologist and college administrator, served 35 years as chairman of the Zoology Department of University of Rhode Island
 Ana Cara 1972 – creolist, translator, and Professor of Hispanic Studies at Oberlin College
 Paul O. Carrese 1989 – Director of the School of Civic & Economic Thought and Leadership at Arizona State University; author of The Cloaking of Power: Montesquieu, Blackstone, and the Rise of Judicial Activism
 Pamela Chasek 1983 – writer and professor in the Department of Government at Manhattan College
 Thomas Jefferson Conant 1823 – Biblical scholar
 Christopher D'Elia 1968 - Dean of the College of the Coast & Environment at Louisiana State University;
 Edward Diller 1961 (MA) – Professor of Germanic Languages and Literature, University of Oregon
Timothy M. Frye 1986 - Chair of the Department of Political Science at Columbia University
 Peter Gries – Harold J. & Ruth Newman Chair in US-China Issues and Director of the Institute for U.S.-China Issues at the University of Oklahoma
 Cynthia Huntington 1983 (MA) – poet, professor of English and Creative Writing at Dartmouth College
 Sheila Miyoshi Jager 1985 (MA) – professor of East Asian Studies at Oberlin College
 Edward A. Jones – linguist, scholar and diplomat
 Dan M. Kahan 1986 – Elizabeth K. Dollard Professor of Law at Yale Law School
 Lawrence Kritzman (MA) – scholar, the Willard Professor of French, Comparative Literature and Oratory at Dartmouth College
 Ben Mathes 1981 – Professor of Mathematics at Colby College
 Christopher Merrill – poet, essayist, director of the International Writing Program at the University of Iowa
 Martha Merrow 1979 – chronobiologist, director of the Institute of Medical Psychology at the Ludwig Maximilian University of Munich
 James Morone 1975 – John Hazen White Professor of Political Science and Public Policy and director of the A. Alfred Taubman Center for American Politics and Policy at Brown University
 Joseph Nevins 1987 – Associate Professor of Geography at Vassar College
 Avital Ronell 1974 – Professor of German, Comparative Literature, and English at New York University
 Stuart B. Schwartz 1962 – George Burton Adams Professor of History at Yale University; Chair of the Council of Latin American and Iberian Studies; former Master of Ezra Stiles College
 Suzanna Sherry 1976 – Herman O. Loewenstein Professor of Law at Vanderbilt University Law School
 James Reist Stoner, Jr. 1977 – Chair of the Department of Government; professor of political science at Louisiana State University
 Hollis Summers 1943 – poet, novelist, short story writer and editor, Professor of English at the University of Kentucky
 Anthony Julian Tamburri – Dean of the John D. Calandra Italian American Institute of Queens College, CUNY; Professor of Italian & Italian/American Studies
Enoch Cobb Wines - 1827 - Minister, Prison Reformer and Professor of Languages at Washington College.

Activism 

Conrad Tillard (born 1964), politician, Baptist minister, radio host, author, and civil rights activist

Arts

Fashion
 Tiziana Domínguez – Spanish fashion designer and artist; daughter of designer Adolfo Domínguez
 Alexandra Kotur – fashion journalist, Style Director and contributing editor for Vogue; author of Carolina Herrera: Portrait of a Fashion Icon; co-author of The World in Vogue: People, Parties, Places

Fine arts
 Peter Gallo 1981 – reclusive artist and writer known for his mixed media works which often combine a variety of unconventional materials
 Robert Gober 1976 – sculptor whose works are exhibited in the Whitney Museum of American Art, the Museum of Modern Art, San Francisco Museum of Modern Art, Solomon R. Guggenheim Museum, the Menil Collection, the Tate Modern and the Hirshhorn Museum and Sculpture Garden
 Woody Jackson 1970 – artist best known for his "Holy Cow" brand and advertising work for Ben & Jerry's ice cream
 Alison Knowles (attended) – visual artist known for her soundworks, installations, performances, and publications; was very active in the Fluxus movement, and continues to create work inspired by her Fluxus experience
 Nancy Rosen – founded Nancy Rosen Incorporated, an organization which plans and implements public art programs and collections, including the Art-for-Public-Spaces program for the U.S. Holocaust Memorial Museum in Washington, D.C.
 Timothy Rub 1974 – Director and CEO of the Philadelphia Museum of Art
 James Rondeau – President and Eloise W. Martin Director of the Art Institute of Chicago

Literature
 John Godfrey Saxe 1839 – poet, known for The Blind Men and the Elephant about the ancient Buddhist parable
 John W. Aldridge (summer session 1942) –   writer and literary critic, professor of English at the University of Michigan, director of the Hopwood Program, and USIA Special Ambassador to Germany
 Julia Alvarez 1971 – award-winning author, poet, and writer-in-residence at Middlebury
Stacie Cassarino 1997 – award-winning poet and author of the collection Zero at the Bone
 Marvin Dana (1867–1926), poet, novelist, and magazine editor
 Frances Frost – poet; novelist; mother of poet Paul Blackburn
 Dwight Garner 1988 – literary critic for The New York Times, former senior editor at the New York Times Book Review
 Patricia Goedicke 1953 – poet
 Hall J. Kelley 1814 – explorer, settler, and writer; strong advocate for U.S. settlement of the Oregon Country in the 1830s
 Richard E. Kim 1959 – Korean-American writer and professor of literature; author of The Martyred (1964), The Innocent (1968), and Lost Names (1970); Guggenheim Fellow (1966) and was recipient of a Fulbright grant
 Peter Knobler 1968 – author, former editor-in-chief of Crawdaddy magazine
 Jeff Lindsay 1975 – playwright and crime novelist, best known for his novels about sociopathic vigilante Dexter Morgan
 Judy Malloy 1964 – poet whose works inhabit the intersection of hypernarrative, magic realism, and information art
 Louise McNeill – poet, essayist, and historian of Appalachia
 Wesley McNair (MA and M.Litt) – poet, writer, editor, and professor
 Emily Mitchell (1997) – Anglo-American novelist
 Wendy Mogel 1973 – speaker and author who looks at parenting problems through the lens of the Torah, the Talmud, and important Jewish teachings
 Jacqueline S. Moore – poet and author of Moments of My Life
 Dan O'Brien – playwright whose plays include The Cherry Sisters Revisited, The Voyage of the Carcass, The Dear Boy, The House in Hydesville, and The Three Christs of Ypsilanti
 Joel Peckham 1992 – poet; scholar of American literature; creative writer
 John Perkins (attended) – activist and author of Confessions of an Economic Hit Man
 John Godfrey Saxe 1839 – poet perhaps best known for his retelling of the Indian parable "The Blind Men and the Elephant"
 Lawrence Raab 1968 – poet
 Lewis Robinson 1993 – writer, author of Officer Friendly and Other Stories
 Johan Theorin (foreign guest student 1985–86) – Swedish journalist and novelist
 Michael Tolkin 1974 – filmmaker and novelist whose screenplays include The Player (1992), which he adapted from his 1988 novel by the same name
 Vendela Vida 1993 – novelist, editor of The Believer magazine
 Anne Walker 1995 – architectural historian and author
 Carol Weston 1979 (MA) – author of twelve books, both fiction and nonfiction; the "Dear Carol" advice columnist at Girls' Life since the magazine's first issue in 1994

Music
 Cherine Anderson 2005 – Jamaican actress and dancehall/reggae vocalist
 Dispatch 1996 – indie jam band, comprising Chad Urmston, Brad Corrigan, and Pete Heimbold, formed at Middlebury
 Bill Homans (attended) – blues musician who performs under the stage name Watermelon Slim
 Anaïs Mitchell 2004 – folk singer-songwriter
 Oneida 1995 – Brooklyn-based noise rock band co-founded by John Colpitts '95 and Patrick Sullivan '95
 John Valby 1966 – musician and comedian

Television and film
 Anna Belknap 1994 – actress, known for her role as Lindsay Monroe on CSI: NY
 Vanessa Branch 1994 – British actress, model, former Miss Vermont, noted for her role in Orbit Gum commercials
 Roscoe Lee Brown (MA) – actor and director, known for his rich voice and dignified bearing
 Jeffrey Bushell 1994 – writer, has written for The Bernie Mac Show, Drawn Together, MADtv, What I Like About You, and Zoey 101
 Kristen Connolly 2002 – actress known for her roles in The Cabin in the Woods and House of Cards
 James Cromwell (attended) – actor noted for his roles in Babe, L.A. Confidential, The Queen, and 24
 Sam Daly 2006 – actor, U.S. production of The Office
 Malaya Drew 1998 – actress known for her roles on The L Word (2008), ER (2006–2007), Las Vegas (2006–2007) and Entourage (2005)
 Lucy Faust – actress and playwright, The Revival, Mudbound and NCIS: New Orleans
 Cassidy Freeman 2005 – actress and singer, known for her role as Tess Mercer in Smallville
 Warren Frost – actor, Twin Peaks, Matlock, The Larry Sanders Show, and Seinfeld
 Justin Haythe 1996 – novelist, short story writer, and screenwriter, screenwriter for The Clearing and the film adaptation of Revolutionary Road
 William Blake Herron 1985 - screenwriter, director, TV creator and show runner, writer-director of A Texas Funeral and co-writer of The Bourne Identity 
 Antonio Macia 2000 – screenwriter, writer of Holy Rollers
 Jason Mantzoukas 1995 – comedian, writer, and actor, known for The League and The Dictator
 Emily McLaughlin – soap opera actress
 Amanda Peterson – actress, star of Can't Buy Me Love
 Rodney Rothman 1995 – writer; screenwriter; author of Early Bird; film writer, producer (Forgetting Sarah Marshall and The Year One); television writer (Late Show with David Letterman and Undeclared)
 Shawn Ryan 1988 – creator of the FX television series The Shield and CBS series The Unit
 Jessica St. Clair 1997 – actress and comedian
 Angus Sutherland 2005 – actor,  Lost Boys: The Tribe
 Jake Weber 1986 – English actor, known for his role as Michael in Dawn of the Dead, Joe Dubois in Medium, and starring opposite Brad Pitt in Meet Joe Black
 Julia Whelan 2008 – actress,  Once and Again
 Becky Worley 1992 – journalist; broadcaster; tech contributor for Good Morning America; host and blogger for a web show on Yahoo! Tech

Theater
 Rob Ackerman – playwright whose plays include Tabletop, which won the 2001 Drama Desk Award for Best Ensemble Performance
 William Burden 1986 – opera singer
 Eve Ensler 1975 – author, playwright, feminist theorist, and peace activist best known for her play The Vagina Monologues
 Rebecca Gilman – playwright
 Dan O'Brien – playwright
 Amanda Plummer (attended) – Tony Award-winning actress

Athletics
 Koby Altman 2004 – current general manager of the NBA's Cleveland Cavaliers
 Hedda Berntsen 1999 – Norwegian world champion skier and 2010 Olympic silver medalist
 John Bower – nordic combined skier who competed in the 1960s and later went on to become a coach of the American nordic skiing team for the 1976 and 1980 Winter Olympic team
 H. Adams Carter 1947 (MA) – mountaineer and language teacher
 Lea Davison 2005 – cross-country mountain biker, member of the U.S. Olympic Team at the 2012 and 2016 Summer Olympics
 Dorcas Denhartog 1987 – nordic skier competing at the 1988, 1992, and 1994 Winter Olympic Games
 Ray Fisher 1910  – Major League baseball player who pitched for the New York Yankees and Cincinnati Reds
 Sarah Groff 2004 – triathlete, 2007 ITU Aquathlon World Champion and member of the U.S. 2012 Summer Olympic Team
 Megan Guarnier 2007 – cyclist, winner of 2016 UCI Women's World Tour and 2016 Giro d'Italia Femminile, and member of the U.S. 2016 Summer Olympic Team
 Stone Hallquist – football running back, played for Milwaukee Badgers in National Football League
 Simi Hamilton 2009 – cross-country skier who has competed since 2000, member of the U.S. 2010 Olympic Cross-Country Ski Team
 Steve Hauschka 2007 – NFL placekicker for the Buffalo Bills
 John W. Hollister (attended) – football player and coach, football coach at Beloit College
 Peter Holmes à Court 1990 – Australian businessman and a joint owner of the National Rugby League team South Sydney Rabbitohs together with Russell Crowe; son of the late billionaire businessman Robert Holmes à Court
 Thomas M. Jacobs – Olympic nordic skier who competed in the 1950s
 Andrew Johnson – member of the U.S. 2006 Olympic Cross-Country Ski Team
 Britton Keeshan – one of the youngest people to climb the tallest mountains on all seven continents (the Seven Summits), as of May 24, 2004
 Ted King 2005 – cyclist
 Bill Kuharich 1976 – Vice President of Player Personnel for the Kansas City Chiefs
 Garrott Kuzzy 2006 – cross-country skier who has competed since 2001, member of the U.S. 2010 Olympic Cross-Country Ski Team
 Kevin Mahaney 1984 – competitive and Olympic sailor who won a silver medal at the Barcelona Olympic Games in 1992
John Morton - 1968 - Olympic biathlon skier, member of seven olympic teams
 Jacquie Phelan 1981–1994  – national mountain bicycle champion (1983, 84, 85); sustainable transit advocate and writer; feminist; founder of Women's Mountain Bike & Tea Society; opened cycling to non-athletic women of all ages; co-founded NORBA and IMBA; Alumni Achievement award winner
 Hig Roberts 2014 - US Ski Team Member and 2 Time National Champion in Giant Slalom and Slalom. First openly gay male alpine skier in the world. 
 Donald Rowe – former coach of the University of Connecticut men's basketball team
 Chad Salmela – current NBC commentator and coach. Former member of the US skiing team from 1990 to 1998.

Business
 George Arison – founder and CEO of Shift
 Louis Bacon 1979 – hedge fund manager, one of Forbes magazine's 400 wealthiest Americans
 Joseph Beninati 1987 – real estate developer and private equity investor
 Randy Brock 1965 – Executive VP, Fidelity Investments; former Vermont Auditor of Accounts (2005–2007); Vietnam War veteran, recipient of the Bronze Star
 Willard C. Butcher (attended) – chairman and CEO of Chase Manhattan Bank, 1980–1991
 Maciej Cegłowski – businessman; founder of Pinboard
 Roger Chapin – businessman-turned-fundraiser, self-described "nonprofit entrepreneur," founder of numerous charities variously under scrutiny for questionable ethics
 John Deere (did not graduate) – blacksmith, inventor of the steel plow and founder of John Deere & Company
 Jim Davis 1966 – Chairman of New Balance; co-founder of Major League Lacrosse; one of Forbes magazine's 400 wealthiest Americans
 Jack Fitzpatrick – founder of Country Curtains; Republican member of the Massachusetts State Senate
 Bryan Goldberg - founder of Bleacher Report; founder and CEO of Bustle (magazine)
 Thomas Seavey Hall 1840 - railroad executive.
 A. Barton Hepburn 1871 – United States Comptroller of the Currency and President of Chase National Bank
 Peter Holmes à Court 1990 – Australian businessman; joint owner of the National Rugby League team South Sydney Rabbitohs with Russell Crowe; son of the late billionaire businessman Robert Holmes à Court
 Akshay K. Khanna 2009 – Vice President of Strategy for the Philadelphia 76ers, New Jersey Devils, and Prudential Center; Forbes 30 Under 30 recipient for Sports in 2017
 Bill Maris 1997 – CEO of Google Ventures
 Terry McGuirk 1973 – chairman of Major League Baseball's Atlanta Braves and vice chairman of Turner Broadcasting System, where he served as CEO from 1996 to 2001
 William H. Porter – prominent New York City banker
 Felix Rohatyn 1949 – President of Rohatyn Associates LLC; former partner and managing director of Lazard; Commander in the Légion d'honneur; member of the Council on Foreign Relations and the American Academy of Arts and Sciences
 Vivian Schiller 1984 (MA) – former president and CEO of National Public Radio; New York Times senior vice president and general manager for NYTimes.com
 Dan Schulman 1980 – President and CEO of PayPal; former CEO of Virgin Mobile USA
 Christopher Tsai – founder of Tsai Capital; major collector of works by Ai Weiwei; son of financier Gerald Tsai
 Otto Berkes - Xbox cofounder at Microsoft; current CEO of Acendre; former CTO of HBO; member of the University of Vermont's Board of Trustees.
 Janice Eldredge Day Jan Day - cofounder of Jafra Cosmetics and major donor to Middlebury College https://archivesspace.middlebury.edu/archival_objects/day_janice_eldredge_class_of_1941

Journalism
 Elizabeth Farnsworth 1965 – journalist and co-anchor of PBS NewsHour with Jim Lehrer
 Trip Gabriel – New York Times style editor
 Dwight Garner 1988 – New York Times book critic
 Mel Gussow 1955 –  theater critic who wrote for The New York Times for 35 years
 W. C. Heinz 1937 – sportswriter and winner of the Red Smith Award for sports journalism
 Andrea Koppel 1985—journalist and former U.S. State Department correspondent and Beijing Bureau Chief for CNN, Time4Coffee podcast host and entrepreneur 
 Alexandra Kotur – fashion journalist, Style Director and contributing editor for Vogue; author of Carolina Herrera: Portrait of a Fashion Icon; co-author of The World in Vogue: People, Parties, Places
 Bob Lefsetz – music industry journalist
 Dori J. Maynard – President of the Robert C. Maynard Institute for Journalism Education in Oakland, California
 Andrew Meldrum – journalist and former correspondent of The Economist and The Guardian in Zimbabwe, 1980–2003
 Nina Munk 1989 (MA) – journalist and non-fiction author; Contributing Editor at Vanity Fair; author of Fools Rush In: Jerry Levin, Steve Case, and the Unmaking of Time Warner
 Mark Patinkin 1974 – columnist at the Providence Journal
 Alex Prud'homme 1984 – journalist and author of nonfiction books, including My Life in France, written in collaboration with his great-aunt Julia Child
 Andrew Purvis – journalist, John S. Knight fellow at Stanford University; former bureau chief for Time magazine's Berlin bureau
 Jane Bryant Quinn 1960 – contributing editor for Newsweek; former author of the twice-weekly column "Staying Ahead," syndicated by the Washington Post Writers Group
 Robert Schlesinger – author; opinion editor for U.S. News & World Report; Huffington Post blogger; co-founder of the blog RobertEmmet
 Frank Sesno 1977 – Washington Bureau Chief and White House correspondent for CNN; Professor of Public Policy at George Mason University and George Washington University
 Vendela Vida 1993 – novelist, journalist, and editor; co-founded and co-edits the monthly periodical The Believer
 David Wolman 1996 – author and journalist; has written for Wired, Newsweek, Discover, National Geographic Traveler, New Scientist and Outside
 Janine Zacharia 1995 – journalist, Middle East correspondent for the Washington Post; former diplomatic reporter for Bloomberg News

Law
 Charles Minton Baker – served in the Wisconsin Territorial Council and the first Wisconsin Constitutional Convention of 1846; helped with the codification of the laws of the state of Wisconsin; served briefly as Wisconsin Circuit Court judge
 Frederick Howard Bryant 1900 – federal judge on the United States District Court for the Northern District of New York
 John C. Churchill 1843 – lawyer and politician
 Walter H. Cleary, 1911 - Chief Justice of the Vermont Supreme Court
 Albert Wheeler Coffrin 1941 – federal judge on the United States District Court for the District of Vermont
 Brian Concannon 1985 – Director of the Institute for Justice & Democracy in Haiti
 George W. F. Cook 1940 – Vermont attorney and politician; President of the Vermont State Senate; United States Attorney for the District of Vermont
 Stephen S. Cushing M.A. 1916 - Associate Justice of the Vermont Supreme Court, 1952-1953
 Charles Davis 1811 – Justice of the Vermont Supreme Court
 Walter C. Dunton – Justice of the Vermont Supreme Court
 Marilyn Jean Kelly 1961 (MA) – jurist in the US state of Michigan, Justice on the Michigan Supreme Court
 Samuel Nelson 1813 – US Supreme Court Justice
 Edward John Phelps 1840 – second controller of the United States Treasury; a founding member and president of the American Bar Association
 William K. Sessions III 1969 – Chief Judge on the United States District Court for the District of Vermont and Chair of the United States Sentencing Commission
 Henry Franklin Severens 1857 – federal judge on the United States District Court for the Western District of Michigan and United States Court of Appeals for the Sixth Circuit
 Martha B. Sosman 1972 – lawyer and jurist from Massachusetts; Associate Justice of the Massachusetts Supreme Judicial Court
 Barry Sullivan 1970 – Chicago lawyer and, as of July 1, 2009, the Cooney & Conway Chair in Advocacy at Loyola University Chicago School of Law; former litigation partner at Jenner & Block LLP
 William H. Walker 1858 - Justice of the Vermont Supreme Court

Military
 David A. Christian – retired United States Army captain and former candidate for the Republican nomination in the 2012 United States Senate election in Pennsylvania
 Paul Eaton (MA) – retired United States Army General known for his outspoken criticisms of President George W. Bush's administration
 Frederic Williams Hopkins 1828 – Adjutant General of the Vermont National Guard, 1837–1852
 Henry Martyn Porter 1857 – American Civil War Union Army Officer; Colonel and commander of the 7th Vermont Infantry

Philanthropy
 Joseph Battell – publisher and philanthropist, owner of the Bread Loaf Inn, predecessor to the Bread Loaf School of English
 Nínive Clements Calegari 1993 – CEO of 826 National; founding executive director of 826 Valencia
 Eileen Rockefeller Growald 1974 – philanthropist and fourth-generation member of the Rockefeller family; founder of the Institute for Healthcare Advancement; the Collaborative for Academic, Social, and Economic Learning; the Champaign Valley Greenbelt Alliance; and Rockefeller Philanthropy Advisors
 Dana Reeve 1984 – philanthropist and actress; founder and former Chair of the Christopher and Dana Reeve Foundation; wife of actor Christopher Reeve
 Alan Reich 1953 (MA) – founder of the National Organization on Disability
 John Wallach 1964 – founder of Seeds of Peace

Politics

Heads of government

 Lado Gurgenidze (attended) – 17th Prime Minister of Georgia

Diplomats

 Jehudi Ashmun (attended) – US representative to the Liberia colony in its second decade and its governor (1824–1828)
 John Beyrle – U.S. Ambassador to Russia under President Barack Obama
 Bradford Bishop (MA) – United States Foreign Service officer who has been a fugitive from justice since allegedly murdering five members of his family in 1976
 Edward John Phelps 1840 – Envoy to Great Britain (1885 to 1889); senior counsel for the United States before the international tribunal at Paris to adjust the Bering Sea controversy
 Felix Rohatyn 1949 – U.S. Ambassador to France under President Clinton
 Joel Turrill 1816 – United States consul to the Kingdom of Hawaii (1845–1850)

U.S. senators and representatives

 Eli Porter Ashmun 1807 – Federalist United States Senator from Massachusetts, 1816–1818
 Elbert S. Brigham 1903 – U.S. Representative from Vermont
 Titus Brown 1811 – United States Representative from New Hampshire
 Daniel Azro Ashley Buck 1807 – U.S. Representative from Vermont
 Alexander W. Buel 1830 – former United States Congressman from Michigan
 Davis Carpenter 1824 – former United States Representative from New York
Sean Casten 1993 - United States representative from Illinois.
 Calvin C. Chaffee 1835 – doctor and former United States Representative from Massachusetts, outspoken opponent of slavery
 Barbara Comstock 1981 – former United States Congresswoman for Virginia's 10th District
 Bill Delahunt 1963 – United States Congressman from Massachusetts
 John Dickson 1808 – U.S. Representative from New York
 Solomon Foot 1826 – former U.S. Senator and President pro tempore of the United States Senate during the Civil War
 Calvin T. Hulburd – former United States Representative from New York
 Rollin Carolas Mallary 1805 – former U.S. Representative from Vermont
 James Meacham 1832 – United States Representative from Vermont
 Frank Pallone 1973 – U.S. Congressman from New Jersey
 John Mason Parker 1828 – U.S. Representative from New York
 Samuel B. Pettengill 1908 – U.S. Representative from Indiana; nephew of William Horace Clagett
 Charles Nelson Pray (attended) – U.S. Representative from Montana
 Albio Sires 1985 (MA) – member of the United States House of Representatives from 
 Robert Stafford 1935 – 71st Governor of Vermont, United States Representative, and U.S. Senator
 John Wolcott Stewart 1846 – U.S. Senator and Representative from Vermont, and from the family for whom Stewart Dorm on the Middlebury campus is named
 Stanley R. Tupper 1943 – U.S. Representative from Maine
 James Wilson II 1820 – U.S. Representative from New Hampshire
 Silas Wright 1815 – former Chairman of the U.S. Senate Finance Committee, Democratic Senator, and Governor of New York

Governors

 Carlos Coolidge 1811 – 19th Governor of Vermont; relative of President Calvin Coolidge
 Jim Douglas 1972 – 80th Governor of Vermont
 Horace Eaton 1825 – 18th Governor of Vermont
 William Alanson Howard 1839 – Member of the United States House of Representatives from Michigan and Governor of the Dakota Territory
 Lyman Enos Knapp 1862 – Governor of the District of Alaska, 1889–1893
 John Mattocks 1832 – 16th Governor of Vermont
 Stephen Royce 1807 – 23rd Governor of Vermont
 William Slade – 17th Governor of Vermont
 John Wolcott Stewart 1807 – 33rd Governor of Vermont
 James Tufts 1855 – politician and acting governor of Montana Territory in 1869
 Mark Gordon (politician) 1979 — 33rd Governor of Wyoming (2019-present)

State senators and representatives

 Claire D. Ayer – Democratic member of the Vermont State Senate, representing the Addison senate district, majority leader of the Vermont Senate as of fall 2006
 James K. Batchelder 1864 – lawyer and five-term member of the Vermont House of Representatives, including one term as Speaker, 1884–1886
 Michael P. Cahill 1983 – politician who represented the 6th Essex district in the Massachusetts House of Representatives, 1993–2003
 Merritt Clark 1823 – Democratic politician from Vermont; he was elected to the Vermont House of Representatives in 1832–33, 1839, and 1865–66, and to the Vermont Senate in 1863–64 and 1868–69, as well as the 1870 Vermont Constitutional Convention
 George W. F. Cook 1940 – Vermont attorney and politician; President of the Vermont State Senate; United States Attorney for the District of Vermont
 Luther Day  – Republican politician in Ohio; was in the Ohio Senate; judge on the Ohio Supreme Court
 George Z. Erwin 1865 – former member of the New York State Senate
 Jack Fitzpatrick – founder of Country Curtains and Republican member of the Massachusetts State Senate
 Nicole Grohoski - Democratic member of the Maine House of Representatives
 Emory A. Hebard 1938 – member of the Vermont House of Representatives, 1961–1977 and Vermont State Treasurer, 1977–1989
 Lindsey Holmes 1995 – member of the Alaska House of Representatives
 Brett Hulsey 1982 – Wisconsin consultant and Democratic politician, elected to the Wisconsin State Assembly's 77th district in 2010
 Sylvester Nevins – Republican member of the Wisconsin State Senate
 William M. Straus 1978 – member of the Massachusetts House of Representatives
 Horace Holmes Thomas, lawyer, Union Army officer, state legislator including a term as Speaker of the Illinois House of Representatives, and  federal customs appraiser
 Alexander Twilight 1823 – first African American to graduate from an American college; first African American elected to public office, serving as a Representative in the Vermont House of Representatives

Other political figures

 Ron Brown 1962 – former Chairman of the Democratic National Committee and U.S. Secretary of Commerce under President Clinton
 Brian Deese 2000 – member of the National Economic Council and special assistant to President Barack Obama for economic policy
 Charles V. Dyer – Chicago abolitionist; Stationmaster on the Underground Railroad
 Ari Fleischer 1982 – White House Press Secretary for President George W. Bush; field director for the National Republican Congressional Committee
 Kenneth Rapuano 1984 – Deputy Homeland Security Advisor for President George W. Bush; Assistant Secretary of Defense for Homeland Defense and Global Security, 2018 to Present
 Beriah Green 1819 – reformer and noted abolitionist
 David G. Hooker 1853 – Mayor of Milwaukee, Wisconsin
 Henry Hitchcock (did not graduate) – first Attorney General of Alabama; grandson of Ethan Allen
 Richard P. Mills 1966 – Commissioner of Education for Vermont and New York
 Lord Ivar Mountbatten – Deputy Lieutenant of Devon; younger son of the David Mountbatten, 3rd Marquess of Milford Haven
 Torie Osborn 1972 – community organizer, LGBT rights activist and politician
 Alban J. Parker 1916 – Vermont Attorney General
 Zina Pitcher 1822 – president of the American Medical Association, a two-time mayor of Detroit and a member of the Board of Regents of the University of Michigan
 Natalie Quillian – White House deputy chief of staff (2023-present), White House deputy Coronavirus response coordinator (2021-2022)
 Waitstill R. Ranney – Vermont doctor and politician; Lieutenant Governor of Vermont, 1841–1843 
 Raymond J. Saulnier 1929 – economist; Chairman of the Council of Economic Advisors (CEA) under President Eisenhower
 Bert L. Stafford, mayor of Rutland
 Dugald Stewart 1842 – Vermont politician; former state Auditor of Accounts
 Richard C. Thomas 1959 – Secretary of State of Vermont

Religion
 Hiram Bingham 1839 – missionary in Hawaii
 Irah Chase 1814 – Baptist clergyman
 Reuben Post 1814 – Presbyterian clergyman; served two separate terms as Chaplain of the United States House of Representatives (1824 and 1831); served as Chaplain of the Senate of the United States (1819)
 Jeremiah Rankin 1848 – abolitionist, champion of the temperance movement, minister of Washington's First Congregational Church, and correspondent with Frederick Douglass
 Enoch Cobb Wines 1827 – 19th-century Congregational minister and prison reform advocate
 Miron Winslow 1813 – Congregationalist missionary in Ceylon

Science
 Louis Winslow Austin 1889 – physicist known for his research on long-range radio transmissions
 Myrtle Bachelder 1930 – chemist and Women's Army Corps officer, noted for her secret work on the Manhattan Project atomic bomb program, and for the development of techniques in the chemistry of metals
 Arthur H. Bulbulian – pioneer in the field of facial prosthetics
 Roger L. Easton 1943 – principal inventor and designer of GPS; recipient of the National Medal of Technology and Innovation
 Stanley Fields 1976 – biologist and HHMI investigator known for pioneering two-hybrid screening for discovering protein–protein interactions
 Edwin James 1816 – botanist, scholar of Algonquian languages, translator and nature writer on the Long Expedition, U.S. Army surgeon, and first Euro-American settler on record to summit Pikes Peak
 Walter D. Knight 1941 – physicist, known for the discovery of Knight shift
 Henry Schoolcraft – geographer, geologist, and ethnologist, noted for his early studies of Native American cultures, and for his "discovery" in 1832 of the source of the Mississippi River
 Jill Seaman 1974 – physician specializing in infectious diseases for Médecins Sans Frontières (Doctors without Borders) and winner of a 2009 MacArthur Foundation "Genius Award"

References

External links

 Alumni Achievement Award Winners

Middlebury College alumni